Erigeron hyperboreus is a rare Arctic species of flowering plant in the family Asteraceae known by the common name tundra fleabane. It has been found only in arctic tundra in Alaska, Yukon, and Northwest Territories.

Description
Erigeron hyperboreus is a small perennial her rarely more than 15 centimeters (6 inches) tall, spreading by means of underground rhizomes. Each plant generally produces only one flower head, with 30-60 white or blue ray florets surrounding yellow disc florets.

References

hyperboreus
Flora of Alaska
Flora of Yukon
Flora of the Northwest Territories
Plants described in 1915
Flora of the Sierra Nevada (United States)
Flora without expected TNC conservation status